David Alan Ezra (born 1947) is a senior United States district judge of the United States District Court for the District of Hawaii. Since January 2013, Ezra has been designated by the Chief Justice of the United States Supreme Court to serve on the United States District Court for the Western District of Texas, San Antonio Division to help ease the heavy workload for the federal judges in Texas.

Early life and education

Born in Columbus, Ohio, Ezra received a Bachelor of Business Administration from St. Mary's University Magna Cum Laude in 1969, followed by a Juris Doctor from St. Mary's University School of Law in 1972, where he graduated first in his class. He served in the US Marine Corps. He also served as a commissioned officer in the United States Army from 1971 to 1977, and was a law clerk in the Office of the Corporation Counsel for the City and County of Honolulu, Hawaii in 1972. Ezra served in the U.S. Marine Corps from 1966-1968 and as an Officer in the U.S. Army from 1971-1976.

Career

Ezra was in private practice in Honolulu, Hawaii from 1972 to 1988 becoming a partner in the law firm of Anthony, Hoddick, Reinwald, and O'Connor in 1980. Ezra became the Managing Partner of the law firm of Ezra, O'Connor, Moon and Tam in 1981. Adjunct professor of law at the William S. Richardson School of Law since 1978. The University of Hawaii awarded him the UH Alumni Association Lifetime Achievement Award in 2013. In 2007 St. Mary's University Awarded Ezra their Rosewood Gavel Award and in 2013 St. Mary's University School of Law awarded him their Lifetime Achievement Award.

Federal judicial service

On November 18, 1987, Ezra was nominated by President Ronald Reagan to a seat on the United States District Court for the District of Hawaii vacated by Judge Samuel Pailthorpe King. Ezra was unanimously confirmed by the United States Senate on May 19, 1988, and received his commission on May 20, 1988. He served as Chief Judge from 1999 to 2005. Ezra was the youngest federal judge ever appointed to the District of Hawaii and the first federal judge from Hawaii to be elected to the Judicial Conference of the United States. Ezra also served as Secretary, Vice President, and President of the District Judges Association of the Ninth Circuit and served multiple terms on the Ninth Circuit Judicial Council. He also served as Vice President of the Federal Judges Association and remains a member of the Board of Directors. Ezra was appointed and served on the Judicial Conference Committee on the Administration of the Bankruptcy System and was its long range planning chairman. In 2010 Ezra was appointed to the Council on Budget and Finance of the Judicial Conference of the United States. Ezra continues to be designated to serve on federal courts both within and outside the Ninth Circuit, particularly in complex cases, and is often designated to sit on the Ninth Circuit Court of Appeals where he holds the record for the most designated sittings of any judge in that Court’s history. He assumed senior status on June 27, 2012 having served as an active judge in regular service longer than any other judge in Hawaii history. Ezra continues to carry a full caseload. In January, 2013, Ezra was designated by the Chief Justice of the United States Supreme Court to the Western District of Texas, San Antonio and Austin Divisions, to help ease the heavy workload for the federal judges in that state. Ezra has a Chambers and Courtrooms in both San Antonio and Austin, Texas

References

Notes

Sources
 

1947 births
Living people
St. Mary's University, Texas alumni
Judges of the United States District Court for the District of Hawaii
United States district court judges appointed by Ronald Reagan
20th-century American judges
United States Army officers
Lawyers from Columbus, Ohio
People from Honolulu
William S. Richardson School of Law faculty
21st-century American judges
United States Marines